Maureen Morfydd Colquhoun (Smith, 12 August 1928 – 2 February 2021) was a British economist and Labour politician. She was Britain's first openly lesbian member of Parliament (MP).

Education and early political career 
Smith was born in Eastbourne, where she was raised by her Irish mother, Elizabeth Smith, a single parent, in a politically active home. She was educated at a local convent school, a commercial college in Brighton, then at the London School of Economics and later worked as a literary research assistant. She joined the Labour Party in her late teens.

Colquhoun contested Tonbridge at the 1970 general election. She served as a councillor in Shoreham-by-Sea, from 1971 to 1974. The only female Shoreham councillor at the time, she was blocked by Conservative opponents from sitting on any of the authority's committees. In January 1970, a decision by Shoreham Urban District Council to block her from appointments as a primary school manager, school governor and library committee membership, on the grounds that she talked too much, was overruled.

Parliamentary career 
Colquhoun was elected as the Member of Parliament (MP) for Northampton North at the February 1974 general election, and identified with the Tribune Group, and served as the group's treasurer. Arguing in favour of creche facilities for female delegates at the following year's Labour conference, she said in October 1975: "It is outrageous that we have to ask for this. The Labour Party pays mere lip service to International Women's Day. ... Young women are deterred from coming because there is no provision for their babies. Those who do are not even allowed to bring their toddlers into the gallery."

In 1975, she introduced the Balance of Sexes Bill with the objective to require men and women on public bodies in equal numbers. She had identified 4,500 jobs appointed by Ministers, and 174 public bodies that were almost entirely male. In her speech to introduce the second reading of the Bill, she commended changes that had been made to the nominations process for the 'central list' from which candidates for government bodies could be selected, although she doubted that it was sufficiently broad to encourage applications from all areas of society. The Bill did not become law.

In 1976, Colquhoun was among nine Labour MPs advocating in a letter to The Times an "alternative policy" on Northern Ireland, including the removal of British troops from the country. She drew a negative response from members of her constituency party, in an area with a significant non-white population, for appearing to defend Enoch Powell in January 1977. "I am rapidly concluding", she said, "that Mr Powell, whom I had always believed to be a racialist before I went into the House of Commons, is not one". She thought that sometimes it was wrong for members of her party to stop listening to what he was saying, and that the "real bogeymen are in the Labour Party" who do not improve the conditions for people in the multi-racial inner-cities. In February 1977, she expressed regret for her comments to her constituency party, withdrew any suggestion she supported Powell's opinions, and affirmed her support for a multi-racial society.

In 1979, she introduced the Protection of Prostitutes Bill into the House of Commons, turning up with 50 prostitutes in order to campaign for the decriminalisation of prostitution. She also campaigned for abortion on demand and for women's prisons to be abolished.

Coming out and deselection 
Colquhoun was Britain's first openly lesbian MP. In 1973, as a married mother of three teenage children, she left her husband, Sunday Times journalist Keith Colquhoun, for the publisher of Sappho magazine, Babs (Barbara) Todd.

In February 1976, Colquhoun asked the then Commons Speaker George Thomas to refer to her as "Ms." instead of "Mrs". It was the first time such a request had been made. Mr Speaker Thomas responded by letter: "In the interests of the House, I think I must continue to use some form of prefix, but I will endeavour to slur it in such a way as to reduce, if not entirely eliminate, the audible distinction between 'Mrs' and 'Miss'". The next month, gossip columnist Nigel Dempster contrived to gain an invitation to Colquhoun and Todd's housewarming party. Colquhoun complained to the Press Complaints Commission, which ruled in the two women's favour. In December 1976, she punched a car park attendant in a row about a parking ticket.

Colquhoun was deselected due to her sexuality and her feminist views; in late September 1977, members of her constituency party's General Management Committee voted by 23 votes to 18, with one abstention, to deselect her, citing her "obsession with trivialities such as women's rights". The local party chairman Norman Ashby said at the time: "She was elected as a working wife and mother ... this business has blackened her image irredeemably". "My sexuality has nothing whatever to do with my ability to do my job as an MP", Colquhoun insisted in an article for Gay News in October 1977. "Being a lesbian has ruined my political career," she told Woman's Own in 1977.

The vote by her constituency party was overruled in January 1978, as supporters of Colquhoun appealed to the National Executive Committee, who agreed that Colquhoun had been unfairly dismissed owing to her sexual orientation. Colquhoun wanted to put the past behind her and work with her local party, but the Vice-Chair of the General Management Committee said he thought that was impossible as many members were unwilling to work for Colquhoun's re-election, the prospects for which he thought were not promising. At the 1979 general election, she lost her seat to the Conservative Antony Marlow on an 8% swing.

She commented in her memoirs, A Woman in the House (1980), that she had “an uncomfortable ability for upsetting equally my friends and my enemies”.

Later life 
Following Colquhoun's defeat as an MP, she worked as an assistant to other Labour MPs in the House of Commons, and was elected to Hackney London Borough Council, serving as a member of the council from 1982 to 1990. She divorced her husband in 1980. Babs Todd was still her partner at Todd's death on 13 February 2020. Her ex-husband, Keith Colquhoun, who she had married in 1948, died from prostate cancer in 2010.

Colquhoun moved to the Lake District where she was a member of the Lake District's National Park Authority between 1998 and 2006. During that time, she campaigned for speed limits on Lake Windermere and argued that members of the park authority should disclose their membership of the Freemasons. Colquhoun also served as a parish councillor on Lakes Parish Council standing in the Ambleside ward until May 2015, when she was de-seated in that year's elections. By the time of her death, she had returned to Sussex.

Her autobiography, Woman in the House, was published in 1980.

Colquhoun died on 2 February 2021, at the age of 92.

References

Bibliography
 Times Guide to the House of Commons 1979
 The Almanac of British Politics 1999

1928 births
2021 deaths
People from Eastbourne
20th-century British women politicians
21st-century British women politicians
Alumni of the London School of Economics
Lesbian politicians
Councillors in Cumbria
Councillors in the London Borough of Hackney
Councillors in West Sussex
English autobiographers
Female members of the Parliament of the United Kingdom for English constituencies
Labour Party (UK) councillors
Labour Party (UK) MPs for English constituencies
LGBT members of the Parliament of the United Kingdom
English LGBT politicians
People from Ambleside
UK MPs 1974–1979
UK MPs 1974
Women autobiographers
20th-century English women
20th-century English people
21st-century English women
21st-century English people
Women councillors in England